Fondation Vasarely is a museum in Aix en Provence, France, dedicated to the works of Victor Vasarely.

History

Fondation Vasarely was established in 1966 by Victor Vasarely, aiming to build a centre "to promote his ideas of 'art for all' and of the 'city of tomorrow'." Construction of the building started in 1973 with architects John Sonnier and Dominique Ronsseray implementing the designs of Vasarely, and it was inaugurated 14 February 1976.

Notes and references

External links
 Fondation Vasarely
 Fondation Vasarely 3D Project

Art museums and galleries in France
Vasarely, Victor
Buildings and structures in Aix-en-Provence